Erica vagans, the Cornish heath or wandering heath, is a species of flowering plant in the family Ericaceae, native to Ireland, Cornwall, western France and Spain. The Latin specific epithet vagans literally means "wandering"; in this context it means "widely distributed".

Description

The small linear leaves with pale undersides and down-rolled margins grow in whorls of four or five on the wiry stems. The inflorescence is a fat, leafy spike with a few long-stalked, globular flowers; these are pink or lilac and have brown stamens that protrude from the open mouths. The flowering period is from July to September.

Cornish population

In Great Britain it is only found on the Lizard peninsula in southern Cornwall, where the unusual geology gives rise to the acid soils that it favours. It was voted the County flower of Cornwall in 2002 following a poll by the wild flora conservation charity Plantlife. It is often considered the Cornish floral emblem. According to one story this is because when Joseph of Arimathea first arrived in Cornwall looking for tin he had nowhere to stay, so he spent his first night on a bed of Cornish heather. In thankfulness, he blessed the plant and it has been a blessed plant ever since.

Cultivation

Like almost all plants in the heath family (Ericaceae), E. vagans requires an acidic or, at the very least, neutral soil to thrive. In areas with alkaline (basic) soil, this can be achieved by planting E. vagans in containers with ericaceous compost. Numerous cultivars have been developed with a range of flower colours in white, pink, mauve and purple.

AGM cultivars
The following cultivars have gained the Royal Horticultural Society's Award of Garden Merit:- 
E. vagans ‘Mrs D.F. Maxwell’ 
E. vagans f. alba 'Cornish Cream' (white-flowered variety)
E. vagans f. alba 'Kevernensis Alba' (white-flowered variety)
E. vagans f. alba 'Lyonnesse' 
E. vagans f. aureifolia 'Valerie Proudley' (gold-leaved variety)

References

Environment of Cornwall
vagans
Flora of England
Taxa named by Carl Linnaeus